The Laurens Polygonal Hog House is a historic farm outbuilding in Dewey County, South Dakota. It is a 10-side structure, with walls and foundation of concrete and stone, and a conical wood frame roof with low pitch, and is partially set into a sloping hillside. It has a single entrance and four windows. The interior is organized with wedge-shaped pens on the outside of a central open area, from which feed and water can be distributed efficiently to the pens. The structure was built in 1926-28 by August and Frank Laurenz, and was used as a hog house until 1956. It has since seen a variety of other agricultural uses.

The building was listed on the National Register of Historic Places in 1995.

See also
National Register of Historic Places listings in Dewey County, South Dakota

References

Agricultural buildings and structures on the National Register of Historic Places in South Dakota
Residential buildings completed in 1928
Buildings and structures in Dewey County, South Dakota
National Register of Historic Places in Dewey County, South Dakota